The central department store (Russian: Центральный универмаг) is a shopping complex on Bolshaya Sadovaya Street, house 46/30, in Rostov-on-Don. It is located in the historic G. G. Pustovoytov House, and has the status of an object of cultural heritage of Russia of regional significance.

History 
The G. G. Pustovoytov House was built in 1910, at the expense of the shipowner and city patron G. G. Pustovoytov.

The building initially housed the "London" and "Central" hotels, and A. Girshtein's jewelry and watch shop. In the old part of the department store there was a branch of the Riga-headquartered company "Provodnik". In Soviet times, the library of the North Caucasian University was located in the building. The building was destroyed in the 1940s, and was rebuilt in 1949 according to the design of architects P. Kalashnikov and G. A. Petrov. In 1965 an additional wing was built, designed by the architect Likhobabin. In the 21st century, the Rostov central department store is located in the premises of Pustovoytov's former trading house. Its total area is more than 4000 square meters. When the department store was reconstructed, the area was enlarged due to the reduction of storage facilities, and the opening of additional premises.

Description 

The building is in the Art Nouveau style with characteristic window elements. The house has a ground, first, second, third and fourth floors. At the time of construction it was one of the largest buildings in the city.

Notes

a.  The building was inscribed on the list of cultural heritage objects by resolution of the head of administration of the Rostov region №. 411 from 10/9/1998, recorded in the edition of the Resolution of the Rostov Region Administration on 27 November 2014 No. 495.

References 

Tourist attractions in Rostov-on-Don
Buildings and structures in Rostov-on-Don
Department stores of Russia
1910 establishments in the Russian Empire
Commercial buildings completed in 1910
Art Nouveau architecture in Russia